Baedal Minjok is a South Korean food delivery unicorn startup. Baedal Minjok is owned by Woowa Brothers Corp. The company's revenue in 2020 was KRW 1.09 Trillion (US$960 Million). In March 2021, Woowa Brothers Corp. and the Baedal Minjok brand were acquired by Delivery Hero.

Baedal Minjok  is the largest food delivery application in South Korea. The South Korean delivery market is one of the largest in the world, worth US$8.6 billion in 2019. In the single month of August 2020, the industry recorded US$1.05 billion of sales.

On April 12, 2021, Baedal Minjok announced the launch of a new product of Baedal Minjok, 'Baemin 1 (one)' for self-employed people.

Company history
Baedal Minjok was created in 2010 by founder Kim Bong-jin (businessman). Kim sought to create a service for restaurants to advertise on, and began by scanning restaurant flyers which he found on the ground of Gangnam, Seoul. Kim created the Baedal Minjok platform to earn a commission on orders which were placed through the application. In the early days of operation, the company founders met and worked in a Cafe in Seoul, rather than in an office.

The company received US$35.6 million of investment from Goldman Sachs in 2014, and a further investment of US$320 million of investment in 2018. The company was valued at KRW 1 trillion in 2015, and by 2018 it was valued at KRW 5 trillion.

In June 2019, Baedal Minjok began operations in Vietnam starting from Ho Chi Minh City. In January of 2021 they pulled out of the Vietnam market.

In December 2019, the company entered acquisition discussions with German delivery company Delivery Hero, as the German firm sought to acquire an 87% stake in the company. Delivery Hero already owned South Korean competitors Yogiyo and Baedaltong. The deal faced pushback from the Korea Fair Trade Commission on anti-trust grounds. The proposed acquisition would give Delivery Hero a 97% market share of the South Korean delivery market. In December 2020, the Korea Fair Trade Commission announced that the US$4 billion was approved on the condition that Delivery Hero sell its Korean subsidiary, Yogiyo.

Free Font Distribution
Font link

In 2012, the company distributed 'Baedal Minjok Hannah font.'

In 2014, the company distributed 'Baedal Minjok Zua font.'

In 2015, the company distributed 'Baedal Minjok Hannah is eleven font.'

In 2016, the company distributed 'Baedal Minjok Do Hyun font.'

In 2017, the company distributed 'Baedal Minjok Yeon Sung font.'

In 2012, the company distributed 'Baedal Minjok Girang Haerang font.'

In 2018, the company distributed 'Baedal Minjok Hannah font Air'

In 2018, the company distributed 'Baedal Minjok Hannah font Pro'

In 2019, the company distributed 'Baedal Minjok Euljiro font'

In 2019, the company distributed 'Baemin Euljiro 10 years later font'

Controversy 
In early 2020, Baedal Minjok was criticized for a new pricing strategy which charged restaurants using its platform a 5.8% fixed-rate fee. This practice was criticized for elevating large chain restaurants while putting smaller restaurants at a disadvantage. Lee Jae-Myung, the governor of Gyeonggi-Do (Korea's largest province) called the price strategy 'tyranny'. Baedal Minjok reversed this new pricing scheme in May of that year.

Baedal Minjok faced controversy over the introduction of their 'flash delivery' service in March 2021. Baedal Minjok freelance delivery drivers claimed that their wages were negatively impacted by the new service.

Companies such as Baedal Minjok, Delivery Container, Yogiyo, Delivery 365, Menu Box, and Delivery O were caught by Korea Fair Trade Commission while hiding complaints and manipulating reviews of compliments. In Baedal Mijok application, 14,057 complaints were reviewed privately, with a fine of 17.5 million won being imposed along with corrective action.

Manhwakyung
In 2019, Woowa Brothers Corp., created a webtoon site Manhwakyung.

References

South Korean companies established in 2010
Companies based in Seoul
Webtoon publishing companies